Abdelkader Lecheheb, sometimes written as Lachheb, (born 13 July 1954) is a Moroccan diplomat and former footballer who is the Moroccan ambassador to Russia. He presented his credentials to Russian President Dmitry Medvedev on 29 May 2009.

Football career
Born in Oujda, Lecheheb played football in his youth. He began playing with local sides USM Oujda and MC Oujda before moving to Casablanca where he played for Wydad Casablanca. Lechebeb scored 23 goals to lead Wydad to the 1975–76 Botola title. He finished playing football with a club in Switzerland.

Lecheheb made 15 appearances for the Morocco national football team.

Diplomatic career
Lecheheb earned degrees in law, and then received a doctorate in international relations in Geneva. He represented Morocco in the Ministry of Foreign Affairs in Switzerland before being appointed Abdellatif Filali's chief of staff in 1994. In 1998, he became Morocco's ambassador to Canada. He would be appointed ambassador to Japan before assuming the role of ambassador to Russia.

References

1954 births
Living people
Moroccan footballers
Morocco international footballers
MC Oujda players
Wydad AC players
Ambassadors of Morocco
Ambassadors of Morocco to Russia
Ambassadors of Morocco to Canada
Ambassadors of Morocco to Japan
People from Oujda
Association footballers not categorized by position